Peter John Snow, Dr. (Born: 25 February 1948) is an Australian neuroscientist and author.

Life
Shortly after his birth in Jubbulpore, India, his father retired from the British Army and moved to Australia. In 1970 Snow graduated with First Class Honors in Zoology. He then enrolled in a PhD program at the University of Alberta, completing his dissertation in invertebrate neurobiology in 1974 before moving to the University Edinburgh, as a Canadian Medical Research Fellow. During this period he pioneered techniques for injecting single mammalian nerve cells with tracers and used these to extensively study the neuronal microcircuitry of the sensory systems within the spinal cord.

In 1976, Dr. Snow was awarded a Queen's Fellowship in Marine Science to study the nervous system of crustaceans at the Australian National University. In 1978, he was appointed to the faculty of the Anatomy Department, University of Queensland where, until his retirement in 1998, he supervised several large medical research programs on the plasticity of the central nervous system and the representation and control of pain. Over this period Dr. Snow also conducted extensive studies on the neurobiology of sharks and stingrays which included research on their somatosensory systems, centers of aggression and ability to withstand extreme hypoxia.

Since retiring from University Dr. Snow has devoted himself to writing 'The Human Psyche' and to delivering a number of lectures on the human psyche, including the Alberta Heritage Foundation of Medical Research Lecture.

Professional associations
Dr. Snow is a member of the International Brain Research Organization (IBRO) and an emeritus member of the Society for Neuroscience (USA). He was also a founding member of the Australian Neuroscience Society (retired), the Australian Physiological & Pharmacological Society (retired) and the Primate Society of America (retired)

Literary and scientific works
Dr. Snow is author of numerous scientific papers, reviews and book chapters and is coauthor, with Dr. P. Wilson, of an extensive monograph on plasticity and development in the somatosensory system. In late 2009, he published the first comprehensive, neuroscientifically-based book on the human psyche.

Scientific research publications
The majority of Dr. Snow's   scientific studies are published in Science, Journal of Physiology (London), Proceedings of the Royal Society London, Journal of Neurophysiology, Neuroscience, Neuroscience Letters, Journal of Comparative Neurology, Brain Research, Journal of Consciousness Studies and Journal of Experimental Biology. They are also available on   PubMed

Scientific monographs

Literary work (non-fiction)

 (8 sections; 210,000 words; 38 original figures). The Human Psyche addresses and answers a host of highly significant questions relating to human existence and survival, at both the individuals and social level. Examples of some of these questions are as follows: What is the biological origin of consciousness, thought and intelligence? What is the relationship between emotions and instinct? How did the human psyche evolve from the brains of our animal relatives? What and where is the human mind? How is the human mind organized to produce different cognitive attributes and different personalities? Why do we need a God and where is the human soul? What conjures within us the experience of love or, alternatively, casts us into the oblivion of darkness? What are the origins of good and evil? How are these extremes of human experience represented in religion? How do we imagine things and how does our imagination differ from our dreams? Do all people think in the same way and, if not, are there greater differences between people from different societies, countries, cultures or races than between members of the same community? Where does belief and faith come from? What is the origin of racial conflict? Why is it so easy for politicians to persuade us to go to war? Why does the aggression of battle always result in rape, plunder and pillage? Are we motivated by our thoughts or our emotions? Is there any basis for the politically correct view that all humans have identical brains and that all behavioral and cultural diversity is learned? Why is it said that the longest road is that between the heart and the head?

References

Australian neuroscientists
University of Tasmania alumni
1948 births
Australian science writers
Academic staff of the University of Queensland
Living people